Yanthram is a Malayalam novel written by Malayatoor Ramakrishnan. The novel is centered on  the theme of civil service (Indian Administrative Service) in Kerala. It portrays the pressure exerted on popular governments by big business and the confrontation between the bureaucratic machinery and the political forces. The novel received the Vayalar Award in 1979.

References

External links
 http://www.jeyamohan.in/?p=33563

Malayalam novels
20th-century Indian novels
Works by Malayattoor Ramakrishnan
Novels set in Kerala